Communications-based train control (CBTC) is a railway signaling system that uses telecommunications between the train and track equipment for traffic management and infrastructure control. CBTC allows a train's position to be known more accurately than with traditional signaling systems. This makes railway traffic management safer and more efficient. Metros (and other railway systems) are able to reduce headways while maintaining or even improving safety.

A CBTC system is a "continuous, automatic train control system utilizing high-resolution train location determination, independent from track circuits; continuous, high-capacity, bidirectional train-to-wayside data communications; and trainborne and wayside processors capable of implementing automatic train protection (ATP) functions, as well as optional automatic train operation (ATO) and automatic train supervision (ATS) functions," as defined in the IEEE 1474 standard.

Background and origin 

The main objective of CBTC is to increase track capacity by reducing the time interval (headway) between trains.

Traditional signalling systems detect trains in discrete sections of the track called 'blocks', each protected by signals that prevent a train entering an occupied block. Since every block is a fixed section of track, these systems are referred to as fixed block systems.

In a moving block CBTC system the protected section for each train is a "block" that moves with and trails behind it, and provides continuous communication of the train's exact position via radio, inductive loop, etc.

As a result, Bombardier opened the world's first radio-based CBTC system at San Francisco airport's automated people mover (APM) in February 2003. A few months later, in June 2003, Alstom introduced the railway application of its radio technology on the Singapore North East line. Previously, CBTC has its former origins in the loop based systems developed by Alcatel SEL (now Thales) for the Bombardier Automated Rapid Transit (ART) systems in Canada during the mid-1980s. 

These systems, which were also referred to as transmission-based train control (TBTC), made use of inductive loop transmission techniques for track to train communication, introducing an alternative to track circuit based communication. This technology, operating in the 30–60 kHz frequency range to communicate trains and wayside equipment, was widely adopted by the metro operators in spite of some electromagnetic compatibility (EMC) issues, as well as other installation and maintenance concerns (see SelTrac for further information regarding Transmission-Based-Train-Control).

As with new application of any technology, some problems arose at the beginning mainly due to compatibility and interoperability aspects. However, there have been relevant improvements since then, and currently the reliability of the radio-based communication systems has grown significantly.

Moreover, it is important to highlight that not all the systems using radio communication technology are considered to be CBTC systems. So, for clarity and to keep in line with the state-of-the-art solutions for operator's requirements, this article only covers the latest moving block principle based (either true moving block or virtual block, so not dependent on track-based detection of the trains) CBTC solutions that make use of the radio communications.

Main features

CBTC and moving block 

CBTC systems are modern railway signaling systems that can mainly be used in urban railway lines (either light or heavy) and APMs, although it could also be deployed on commuter lines. For main lines, a similar system might be the European Railway Traffic Management System ERTMS Level 3 (not yet fully defined ).
In the modern CBTC systems the trains continuously calculate and communicate their status via radio to the wayside equipment distributed along the line. This status includes, among other parameters, the exact position, speed, travel direction and braking distance. 

This information allows calculation of the area potentially occupied by the train on the track. It also enables the wayside equipment to define the points on the line that must never be passed by the other trains on the same track. These points are communicated to make the trains automatically and continuously adjust their speed while maintaining the safety and comfort (jerk) requirements. So, the trains continuously receive information regarding the distance to the preceding train and are then able to adjust their safety distance accordingly.

From the signalling system perspective, the first figure shows the total occupancy of the leading train by including the whole blocks which the train is located on. This is due to the fact that it is impossible for the system to know exactly where the train actually is within these blocks. Therefore, the fixed block system only allows the following train to move up to the last unoccupied block's border.

In a moving block system as shown in the second figure, the train position and its braking curve is continuously calculated by the trains, and then communicated via radio to the wayside equipment. Thus, the wayside equipment is able to establish protected areas, each one called Limit of Movement Authority (LMA), up to the nearest obstacle (in the figure the tail of the train in front). Movement Authority (MA) is the permission for a train to move to a specific location within the constraints of the infrastructure and with supervision of speed. 

End of Authority is the location to which the train is permitted to proceed and where target speed is equal to zero. End of Movement is the location to which the train is permitted to proceed according to an MA. When transmitting an MA, it is the end of the last section given in the MA.

It is important to mention that the occupancy calculated in these systems must include a safety margin for location uncertainty (in yellow in the figure) added to the length of the train. Both of them form what is usually called 'Footprint'. This safety margin depends on the accuracy of the odometry system in the train.

CBTC systems based on moving block allows the reduction of the safety distance between two consecutive trains. This distance is varying according to the continuous updates of the train location and speed, maintaining the safety requirements. This results in a reduced headway between consecutive trains and an increased transport capacity.

Grades of automation 
Modern CBTC systems allow different levels of automation or Grades of Automation (GoA), as defined and classified in the IEC 62290-1. In fact, CBTC is not a synonym for "driverless" or "automated trains" although it is considered as a basic enabler technology for this purpose.

The grades of automation available range from a manual protected operation, GoA 1 (usually applied as a fallback operation mode) to the fully automated operation, GoA 4 (Unattended Train Operation, UTO). Intermediate operation modes comprise semi-automated GoA 2 (Semi-automated Operation Mode, STO) or driverless GoA 3 (Driverless Train Operation, DTO). The latter operates without a driver in the cabin, but requires an attendant to face degraded modes of operation as well as guide the passengers in the case of emergencies. The higher the GoA, the higher the safety, functionality and performance levels must be.

Main applications 

CBTC systems allow optimal use of the railway infrastructure as well as achieving maximum capacity and minimum headway between operating trains, while maintaining the safety requirements. These systems are suitable for the new highly demanding urban lines, but also to be overlaid on existing lines in order to improve their performance.

Of course, in the case of upgrading existing lines the design, installation, test and commissioning stages are much more critical. This is mainly due to the challenge of deploying the overlying system without disrupting the revenue service.

Main benefits 
The evolution of the technology and the experience gained in operation over the last 30 years means that modern CBTC systems are more reliable and less prone to failure than older train control systems. CBTC systems normally have less wayside equipment and their diagnostic and monitoring tools have been improved, which makes them easier to implement and, more importantly, easier to maintain.

CBTC technology is evolving, making use of the latest techniques and components to offer more compact systems and simpler architectures. For instance, with the advent of modern electronics it has been possible to build in redundancy so that single failures do not adversely impact operational availability.

Moreover, these systems offer complete flexibility in terms of operational schedules or timetables, enabling urban rail operators to respond to the specific traffic demand more swiftly and efficiently and to solve traffic congestion problems. In fact, automatic operation systems have the potential to significantly reduce the headway and improve the traffic capacity compared to manual driving systems.

Finally, it is important to mention that the CBTC systems have proven to be more energy efficient than traditional manually driven systems. The use of new functionalities, such as automatic driving strategies or a better adaptation of the transport offer to the actual demand, allows significant energy savings reducing the power consumption.

Risks 
The primary risk of an electronic train control system is that if the communications link between any of the trains is disrupted then all or part of the system might have to enter a failsafe state until the problem is remedied. Depending on the severity of the communication loss, this state can range from vehicles temporarily reducing speed, coming to a halt or operating in a degraded mode until communications are re-established. If communication outage is permanent some sort of contingency operation must be implemented which may consist of manual operation using absolute block or, in the worst case, the substitution of an alternative form of transportation.

As a result, high availability of CBTC systems is crucial for proper operation, especially if such systems are used to increase transport capacity and reduce headway. System redundancy and recovery mechanisms must then be thoroughly checked to achieve a high robustness in operation.
With the increased availability of the CBTC system, there is also a need for extensive training and periodical refresh of system operators on the recovery procedures. In fact, one of the major system hazards in CBTC systems is the probability of human error and improper application of recovery procedures if the system becomes unavailable.

Communications failures can result from equipment malfunction, electromagnetic interference, weak signal strength or saturation of the communications medium. In this case, an interruption can result in a service brake or emergency brake application as real time situational awareness is a critical safety requirement for CBTC and if these interruptions are frequent enough it could seriously impact service. This is the reason why, historically, CBTC systems first implemented radio communication systems in 2003, when the required technology was mature enough for critical applications.

In systems with poor line of sight or spectrum/bandwidth limitations a larger than anticipated number of transponders may be required to enhance the service. This is usually more of an issue with applying CBTC to existing transit systems in tunnels that were not designed from the outset to support it. An alternate method to improve system availability in tunnels is the use of leaky feeder cable that, while having higher initial costs (material + installation) achieves a more reliable radio link.

With the emerging services over open ISM radio bands (i.e. 2.4 GHz and 5.8 GHz) and the potential disruption over critical CBTC services, there is an increasing pressure in the international community (ref. report 676 of UITP organization, Reservation of a Frequency Spectrum for Critical Safety Applications dedicated to Urban Rail Systems) to reserve a frequency band specifically for radio-based urban rail systems. Such decision would help standardize CBTC systems across the market (a growing demand from most operators) and ensure availability for those critical systems.

As a CBTC system is required to have high availability and particularly, allow for a graceful degradation, a secondary method of signaling might be provided to ensure some level of non-degraded service upon partial or complete CBTC unavailability. This is particularly relevant for brownfield implementations (lines with an already existing signalling system) where the infrastructure design cannot be controlled and coexistence with legacy systems is required, at least, temporarily.

For example, the New York City Canarsie Line was outfitted with a backup automatic block signaling system capable of supporting 12 trains per hour (tph), compared with the 26 tph of the CBTC system. Although this is a rather common architecture for resignalling projects, it can negate some of the cost savings of CBTC if applied to new lines. This is still a key point in the CBTC development (and is still being discussed), since some providers and operators argue that a fully redundant architecture of the CBTC system may however achieve high availability values by itself.

In principle, CBTC systems may be designed with centralized supervision systems in order to improve maintainability and reduce installation costs. If so, there is an increased risk of a single point of failure that could disrupt service over an entire system or line. Fixed block systems usually work with distributed logic that are normally more resistant to such outages. Therefore, a careful analysis of the benefits and risks of a given CBTC architecture (centralized vs. distributed) must be done during system design.

When CBTC is applied to systems that previously ran under complete human control with operators working on sight it may actually result in a reduction in capacity (albeit with an increase in safety). This is because CBTC operates with less positional certainty than human sight and also with greater margins for error as worst-case train parameters are applied for the design (e.g. guaranteed emergency brake rate vs. nominal brake rate). For instance, CBTC introduction in Philly's Center City trolley tunnel resulted initially in a marked increase in travel time and corresponding decrease in capacity when compared with the unprotected manual driving. This was the offset to finally eradicate vehicle collisions which on-sight driving cannot avoid and showcases the usual conflicts between operation and safety.

Architecture 

The typical architecture of a modern CBTC system comprises the following main subsystems:

 Wayside equipment, which includes the interlocking and the subsystems controlling every zone in the line or network (typically containing the wayside ATP and ATO functionalities). Depending on the suppliers, the architectures may be centralized or distributed. The control of the system is performed from a central command ATS, though local control subsystems may be also included as a fallback.
 CBTC onboard equipment, including ATP and ATO subsystems in the vehicles.
 Train to wayside communication subsystem, currently based on radio links.

Thus, although a CBTC architecture is always depending on the supplier and its technical approach, the following logical components may be found generally in a typical CBTC architecture:

Onboard ETCS system. This subsystem is in charge of the continuous control of the train speed according to the safety profile, and applying the brake if it is necessary. It is also in charge of the communication with the wayside ATP subsystem in order to exchange the information needed for a safe operation (sending speed and braking distance, and receiving the limit of movement authority for a safe operation).
Onboard ATO system. It is responsible for the automatic control of the traction and braking effort in order to keep the train under the threshold established by the ATP subsystem. Its main task is either to facilitate the driver or attendant functions, or even to operate the train in a fully automatic mode while maintaining the traffic regulation targets and passenger comfort. It also allows the selection of different automatic driving strategies to adapt the runtime or even reduce the power consumption.
Wayside ETCS system. This subsystem undertakes the management of all the communications with the trains in its area. Additionally, it calculates the limits of movement authority that every train must respect while operating in the mentioned area. This task is therefore critical for the operation safety.
Wayside ATO system. It is in charge of controlling the destination and regulation targets of every train. The wayside ATO functionality provides all the trains in the system with their destination as well as with other data such as the dwell time in the stations. Additionally, it may also perform auxiliary and non-safety related tasks including for instance alarm/event communication and management, or handling skip/hold station commands.
Communication system. The CBTC systems integrate a digital networked radio system by means of antennas or leaky feeder cable for the bi-directional communication between the track equipment and the trains. The 2,4GHz band is commonly used in these systems (same as WiFi), though other alternative frequencies such as 900 MHz (US), 5.8 GHz or other licensed bands may be used as well.
ATS system. The ATS system is commonly integrated within most of the CBTC solutions. Its main task is to act as the interface between the operator and the system, managing the traffic according to the specific regulation criteria. Other tasks may include the event and alarm management as well as acting as the interface with external systems.
Interlocking system. When needed as an independent subsystem (for instance as a fallback system), it will be in charge of the vital control of the trackside objects such as switches or signals, as well as other related functionality. In the case of simpler networks or lines, the functionality of the interlocking may be integrated into the wayside ATP system.

Projects
CBTC technology has been (and is being) successfully implemented for a variety of applications as shown in the figure below (mid 2011). They range from some implementations with short track, limited numbers of vehicles and few operating modes (such as the airport APMs in San Francisco or Washington), to complex overlays on existing railway networks carrying more than a million passengers each day and with more than 100 trains (such as lines 1 and 6 in Madrid Metro, line 3 in Shenzhen Metro, some lines in Paris Metro, New York City Subway and Beijing Subway, or the Sub-Surface network in London Underground).

Despite the difficulty, the table below tries to summarize and reference the main radio-based CBTC systems deployed around the world as well as those ongoing projects being developed. Besides, the table distinguishes between the implementations performed over existing and operative systems (brownfield) and those undertaken on completely new lines (Greenfield).

List

Notes and references

Notes

References

Further reading

 Argenia Railway Technologies SafeNet CBTC
 Thales SelTrac(R) CBTC
 Metro Rail Communication Network Simulation

Train protection systems
Telematics
Railway signalling block systems